George W. Miller Jr. (May 14, 1930 – December 15, 2021) was an American politician. He served as a Democratic member of the North Carolina House of Representatives.

Life and career 
Miller was born in Spencer, North Carolina. He attended the University of North Carolina and the University of North Carolina School of Law. He served in the United States Marine Corps during the Korean conflict.

In 1971, Miller was elected to the North Carolina House of Representatives, serving until 2000.

Miller died in December 2021 at his home, at the age of 91.

References 

1930 births
2021 deaths
People from Spencer, North Carolina
Democratic Party members of the North Carolina House of Representatives
20th-century American politicians
University of North Carolina alumni
University of North Carolina School of Law alumni

Year of birth missing (living people)
Living people